United Student Movement was united front of several left-wing student federations in Pakistan. It included All Pakistan Muhajir Students Organisation, Baloch Students Federation, Democratic Students Federation, National Students Federation, and Peoples Students Federation. Its main opponent in elections was the right-wing Islami Jamiat Talaba (IJT).

References

Students' federations of Pakistan